Bashlykent (Başlı) is a rural locality (a selo) in Kayakentsky District, Republic of Dagestan, Russia. The population was 3,230 as of 2010. There are 23 streets.

Geography 
Bashlykent is located 29 km southwest of Novokayakent (the district's administrative centre) by road. Dzhavankent and Kapkaykent are the nearest rural localities.

Nationalities 
Kumyks live there.

Famous residents 
 Sakinat Gadzhiyeva (scientist-ethnographer, Doctor of Historical Sciences, Professor, Honored Scientist of the Russian Federation and the Republic of Dagestan)
 Balash Balashov (State Duma deputy)

References 

Rural localities in Kayakentsky District